Soh Rui Yong (born 6 August 1991) is a Singaporean national long-distance runner, and holder of four national records: 5,000m, 10,000m, half marathon and marathon. In 2017, Soh became the first Singaporean male marathoner to win back-to-back SEA Games titles when he won gold again at the Southeast Asian Games. He has been enrolled in University College London’s law school since 2021.

Soh was embroiled in 3 legal disputes involving former national runner Ashley Liew, as well as Singapore Athletics and Malik Aljunied of the Singapore National Olympic Council between 2019 and 2022  which led him to be excluded from participating in two consecutive SEA Games in 2019 and 2021.

Early life
Soh was born in Singapore in 1991. Soh's mother is a teacher, and his younger sister Romaine is also an accomplished runner. When Soh was at Raffles Institution, he won the A Division individual cross-country title two years in a row.

Education 
Soh graduated from the University of Oregon in the United States, where he studied business administration.

Soh has been reading for a law degree at University College London since 2021.

Career
On 14 June 2014, Soh set a new national record for the 10,000m track event at the Portland Track Festival with a timing of 31:15.95, beating the previous record of 31:19:00 set by P.C. Suppiah in November 1973.

Soh won his first marathon gold at the 2015 Southeast Asian Games and became the first Singaporean male marathoner to win back-to-back SEA Games titles when he won gold again at the 2017 Southeast Asian Games despite almost being expelled from the team a week before the race.

In August 2017, Soh courted controversy when he was given a formal warning by the Singapore National Olympic Council (SNOC).

On 20 January 2019, Soh set a new half marathon national record of 66:46 at the 2019 Aramco Houston Half Marathon, breaking Mok Ying Ren's 3-year-old record of 67:08. This made him the only Singapore man in history to concurrently hold the 10,000m (31:15.95) and half marathon national records. On 17 March 2019, Soh broke the Singapore marathon record after finishing the Seoul Marathon in 2:23:42. However, Soh was not selected to compete in the 2019 Southeast Asian Games by SNOC to defend his marathon gold despite being nominated by SA.

On 17 July 2021, at the Singapore Athletics All Comers Meet 4, Soh clocked 14:44.21 for the 5,000m, breaking Mok's record of 14:51.09. With this result, Soh became the holder of four national records: 5,000m, 10,000m, half-marathon, and marathon.

On 4 September 2021, Soh clocked 6:53.18 in a 2.4km run – the fastest recorded time in Singapore. He issued a challenge to all Singaporeans to clock a sub-7 timing; anyone succeeding would receive $700 and 700 bottles of Pocari Sweat paid by Soh. The challenge was eventually carried out at Pocari Sweat Run, a local running event, on 8 January 2022. In it, Jeevaneesh Soundararajah set a new record at 6:52.97.

On 28 November 2021, Soh took on the fastest Gurkha soldier in Singapore, Subas Gurung, over 10,000m at the Singapore Athletics Allcomers 5 Track Meet. Soh won the race in 31:28.67, becoming the first Singaporean in history to qualify for the Asian Games 10,000m final. 

On 5 December 2021, Soh broke his national record for the marathon when he ran 2:22:59 at the Valencia Marathon. This performance made him the first marathon runner in Singapore history to qualify for the Asian Games Marathon. 

On 17 February 2022, SNOC announced that Soh would be excluded from 2021 Southeast Asian Games (2021 SEA Games) that is to be held in Hanoi in May 2022 (which delayed due to COVID-19 pandemic). The basis for the exclusion was similar to that for his exclusion from the 2019 Southeast Asian Games, on his conduct and behaviour "continu[ing] to fall short" of the standards SNOC expected of its athletes. He would not be competing in the 2022 Asian Games as well due to the same issue with SNOC.

On 17 June 2022, Soh would overwrite his 2014 national record for the 10,000m track event with a timing of 31:12.05 at the England Athletics' Championships.

Sponsorship 
In 2021, Soh signed a four year endorsement deal with Under Armour, an American apparel brand, to be part of its global athletes programme. In the same year, Soh was signed on as a brand ambassador of Takagi Ramen, a Singapore ramen chain, and also gained sponsorship deal with Pocari Sweat, a Japanese isotonic drink brand.

Legal disputes

Disputing Ashley Liew's act of sportsmanship 
In October 2018, Soh disputed fellow runner Ashley Liew's version of events surrounding the 2015 SEA Games marathon. For this, Liew was awarded the Special Award for Sportsmanship by Singapore National Olympic Council and the International Fair Play Committee's (CIFP) Pierre de Coubertin World Fair Play Trophy in 2016. 3 other witnesses, including Filipino runner Rafael Poliquit Jr. who was also in the same race, backed Soh's version of events in the media.

Liew took Soh to the courts for defamation after serving Soh legal letters offering him an opportunity to retract his statements. Soh subsequently filed a counterclaim. On 23 September 2021, District Judge Lee Li Choon "found that the words in Soh's statements were defamatory, or bore defamatory meanings." Lee granted orders to have the defamatory statements removed; Soh to issue a statement declaring that the statements are false and to retract the false statements and publish an apology; and an injunction against future republishing of the statements. Soh was also ordered to pay  in damages, of which he turned to crowdfunding as Liew's lawyers requested for immediate payment. Soh appealed to the High Court, and was heard 28 March 2022 with the appeal dismissed. Justice Valerie Thean upheld District Judge Lee's rulings and orders to Soh not to repeat the statements and to remove them, but also had set aside the order to publish an apology and public statement of retraction of the defamatory statements. Soh reflected that he would respect the decision and move on from this. When the payment of the full sum of $320,000 was made on 5 April 2022, Soh then challenged Liew to donate the $180,000 damage cost to "prove [his] sportmanship" as it was funded with donations Soh crowdfunded from the public.

Exclusion from SEA Games 2019 
For 2019 Southeast Asian Games, Soh's nomination by Singapore Athletics (SA) was rejected by the Singapore National Olympic Council (SNOC) for "display[ing] conduct that falls short of the standards of attitude and behaviour" that SNOC expected of its athletes. SNOC had earlier served Soh a legal letter to withdraw his allegations against Ashley Liew. A debate ensued over whether a potential medallist should be barred from being a national representative due to personal conduct issues. After failing to obtain explanations from SA and SNOC over their statements made of him through an exchange of legal letters, Soh filed defamation writs and statement of claims against SA and SA executive director Syed Abdul Malik Aljunied.

After the management of SA was changed on 25 September 2020, both parties reached a truce in which Soh stood down on his lawsuits against SA, and SA withdrawing its media statements on Soh "breach[ing] (SA’s) Athletic Code of Conduct” and that for "his transgressions, (SA) had attempted to counsel and reason with him, as part of a holistic rehabilitation process"; extending an apology to him; and stood down the disciplinary actions that the previous management had taken against him. The defamation case against Malik continued and was heard on 12 January 2022.

References

Living people
1991 births
Singaporean male long-distance runners
Singaporean people of Chinese descent
University of Oregon alumni
Singaporean male marathon runners
Southeast Asian Games medalists in athletics
Southeast Asian Games gold medalists for Singapore
Competitors at the 2015 Southeast Asian Games
Competitors at the 2017 Southeast Asian Games